Radial spoke head protein 3 homolog (RSPH3), also known as radial spoke head-like protein 2 (RSHL2), is a protein that in humans is encoded by the RSPH3 gene.

References

Further reading